Michał Stachyra aka Puszon (born December 27, 1978 in Kraków, Poland) – polish game designer and publisher, owner of Kuźnia Gier Publishing House.

He is author and publisher of RPG, boardgames and card games.

RPG 
Stachyra is co-author of:
 Wolsung: Steam Pulp Fantasy: main book and sourcebooks (2009-2015)
 The Witcher RPG: sourcebook: Novigrad (2002)
 Q-10 RPG system

He is an editor of Wolsung and polish versions of Savage Worlds, Adventurers and Grey Ranks.

Board and card games 
Michał Stachyra is an author of more than 20 board and card games:
Aktywuj Warszawę, Erynie, Evolutio!, Fandoom, Gazociągi: Gra o inwestycje, Grunwald: Walka 600-lecia, Intryga 13th Street, Iwigilacja - gra towarzyska, Inwigilacja luksusowa, Kapitan Bomba, Kogeneracja, Kung Fu, Labirynt Czarnoksiężnika, Magiczna Warka, Na sygnale, Pirates 2ed: Governor's Daughter, Pioniersi, Polowanie na Trolla, Process legislacyjny - gra planszowa, Rice Wars, Ryzykanci: Koleje Fortuny, Troja, Tropem Dębowego Liścia, Veto, Veto: the Boardgame, Wiochmen Rejser, Wiedźmin - Przygodowa Gra Karciana The Witcher card game, Wiedźmin: gra promocyjna, Wolsung: the Boardgame, Wypas.

Awards 
Stachyra won Śląkfa Award (2009) and Identyfkatory Pyrkonu Award (2015)

References

External links 
 Profile on Board Game Geek

Board game designers
Role-playing game designers
Living people
1978 births